The Freeman Plantation is a Southern plantation with a historic mansion  located in Jefferson, Texas, USA. The house was designed in the Greek Revival architectural style, and it was completed in 1850. It has been listed on the National Register of Historic Places since November 25, 1969. It was purchased by the Daughters of the American Revolution in 1971.

See also

National Register of Historic Places listings in Marion County, Texas
Recorded Texas Historic Landmarks in Marion County

References

External links

Plantation houses in Texas
Houses in Marion County, Texas
Jefferson, Texas
Houses completed in 1850
Houses on the National Register of Historic Places in Texas
National Register of Historic Places in Marion County, Texas
Recorded Texas Historic Landmarks
Greek Revival houses in Texas